Juice107.3 (call sign: 4CAB) is a Christian radio station on the Gold Coast, Queensland, Australia.

It broadcasts at 107.3 MHz. The station's motto is Good Taste Radio. The station offers a ratio of 60% Christian Music to 40% Mainstream. As well as playing music, Juice107.3 offers news, sport and general talk programs.

External links
 Juice107.3
 Juice107.3 Live

Christian radio stations in Australia
Community radio stations in Australia
Radio stations on the Gold Coast, Queensland